After irrigation projects diverted water from the Aral Sea it began to dry up and left behind salts, other minerals, and toxins in the soil.  These not only contaminated the soil but also were picked up by winds and storms, and traveled to other areas, including over crop lands.  This has led to increased health problems like respiratory diseases and cancers, among others.  The change in the size of the Aral has also affected the local climate and resulted in increased occurrence and worsening of storms.

Background
There is no doubt that the shrinking of the Aral Sea has resulted in health problems for the local community.  However, there is debate as to what extent of these problems can be sourced to this environmental situation. The full effects could take a generation to fully materialize and patterns of health problems to show up. 
Some of the main reasons why the Aral sea area suffered greatly were from "over irrigation and water mismanagement." Environmental impacts resulting from the changes in the Aral Sea region that could affect human health are "the salinization of the water table, pesticides in the environment and food chain, dust storms and air quality."

In Soviet period, water from Amu Darya and Syr Darya rivers streaming into The Aral Sea was redirected into cotton fields of Uzbekistan. Grazings and gainful grounds of Amu Darya and Syr Darya employed more than 100 thousand individuals in the fields of poultry, harvest development and livestock. In the Uzbek region years of monoculture agriculture of cotton fields left soils depleted of naturally occurring minerals and nutrients.  This eventually led to an increased use of pesticides and fertilizers to try and counter these new soil deficiencies.  However, these increased chemicals found their way into the soils, water, and finally the Aral sea.  These types of agricultural activities have also "resulted in widespread soil erosion, chemical pollution, and poor water quality and quantity."

Health infrastructure, including hospitals and medical centers located In the Aral Sea region are in need of fundamental medical tools, and other equipment for improving health services. Medical staff does not have necessary conditions to successfully accomplish their job.

Effects on infant mortality rates
As the sea dries up the contaminants become exposed on the surface and enter into the soil while also being blown into the air.  These environmental impacts have had wide-ranging effects on health of local residents. Around 35 million individuals live near the Aral Sea Basin of which 3.5 million live in the disaster area. Increases in the occurrence of many diseases and conditions have been noted and linked to the shrinking of the Aral.  Facing the highest risk from exposure to contaminants and toxins are infants and children.  This has contributed to an increasing infant mortality rate in the area.  According to Newbold the infant mortality rate is defined as "the number of deaths of infants younger than one year of age per one thousand births."

Infant mortality rates have been increasing in this region since the 1970s, while elsewhere in the world they have generally been going down.  For residents of the Aral sea region living there has led to high "exposure to industrial pollutants such as polychlorinated biphenyl (PCB) compounds and heavy metals but also to pesticides."  This phenomenon leading to increased infant mortality rates has been reported as high as 70 in Kazakhstan as of 1993.  Toxins can come from all sources including breathing them in from the air, drinking water, and food.  However, a young baby does not have much choice about what to eat or drink.  It has been found that these contaminants can be passed down through breast feeding and "in a number of areas the physicians recommend against breast feeding babies, as the nursing mothers milk is toxic."

As seen in Table 1, other surrounding countries and areas have also experienced an increase in infant mortality rates.  Although there are many other factors that contribute to infant mortality rates, the environmental state in the area has a definite influence on increasing rates.  When compared with developed countries these rates can illustrate differences in health care and access to health care between the areas.

Table 1: Infant Mortality Rates, 1985 -2008

List of adverse health effects
In Turkmenistan alone, 50% of all reported illnesses in children are related to respiratory system difficulties.  The effects of this situation are far reaching and affect people in a wide range of ailments.  Following is a list of health problems contributing to high infant mortality, death, and lower standard of living in the Aral Sea area:

 diarrheal diseases
 vaccine preventable diseases such as tuberculosis
 nutritional deficiencies
 upper respiratory tract infections
 teratogenesis
 endocrine disruption
 neurodevelopmental effects
 behavioral effects
 gastro-enteritis
 typhoid fever
 hepatitis
 esophageal cancer
 various other cancers
 hypertension
 heart disease
 anemia
 kidney disease
 eye disease

Solutions
A large concern of remediation of the area is the reduction of the blowing salt and minerals from the exposed  sea bed.  Some solutions include constructing dikes to control water flows and restricting the water amounts diverted for irrigation.  However, the health effects have already been felt and will continue to be present for a long time even if the situation is turned around in the very near future.

References

Aral Sea
Health in Afghanistan
Health in Kazakhstan
Health in Kyrgyzstan
Health in Tajikistan
Health in Turkmenistan
Health in Uzbekistan
Health disasters in Asia